Toponymie générale de la France (General Toponymy of France, TGF for short), subtitled Étymologie de 35.000 noms de lieux (Etymology of 35,000 place names), is a book in four volumes about the origins of place names throughout France.  It was published by Ernest Nègre at Librarie Droz in Geneva, Switzerland.

The work is divided as follows:

 Volume I (1990), pages 1–704** Introduction (§§ 001–011)
 Part I: Pre-Celtic names (§§ 1001–1773)
 Part II: Celtic names (§§ 2000–4100)
 Part III: Eastern contributions (§§ 4501–4528)
 Part IV: Latin or Roman names (§§ 5001–11862)
 Volume II (1991), pages 714–1381
 Part V: Non-Roman names (§§ 12001–19261)
 Part VI (beginning): Dialectal names (§§ 20001–25617)
 Volume III (1998), pages 1400–1852
 Part VI (continued): Dialectal names (§§ 25618–30449)
 Part VII: French names (§§ 31000–31150)
 Index
 Errata and addenda (1998).  Pages 1856–1871; no new paragraphs.

Each French commune is given a new number, independent of its INSEE code and its postal code.

French dictionaries